Venerque is a commune in the Haute-Garonne department in southwestern France. Venerque-le-Vernet station has rail connections to Toulouse, Foix and Latour-de-Carol.

Population
The inhabitants of the commune are known as Venerquois or Venerquoises in French.

Monuments

Personalities
Jean-Baptiste Noulet

See also
Communes of the Haute-Garonne department

References

Communes of Haute-Garonne